Account number may refer to: 
 A number used to identify a bank account
 Bank card number, the primary account number found on credit cards and bank cards
 International Bank Account Number, an international standard for identifying bank accounts across national borders
 National identification number, a number used by the governments of many countries as a means of tracking people for the purposes of work, taxation, government benefits, health care, and other governmentally-related functions.